The 2019 Quaker State 400 presented by Walmart was a Monster Energy NASCAR Cup Series race held on July 13, 2019 at Kentucky Speedway in Sparta, Kentucky. Contested over 269 laps—extended from 267 laps due to an overtime finish, on the  speedway, it was the 19th race of the 2019 Monster Energy NASCAR Cup Series season.

Report

Background

The sixth running of the Quaker State 400 was held in Sparta, Kentucky at Kentucky Speedway on July 9, 2016. The track is a  tri-oval speedway owned by Speedway Motorsports, Inc. Kentucky Speedway, which has also hosted the ARCA Racing Series, NASCAR Gander Outdoors Truck Series, NASCAR Xfinity Series, and the Indy Racing League, has a grandstand seating capacity of 107,000.

Entry list 
 (i) denotes driver who are ineligible for series driver points.
 (R) denotes rookie driver.

Practice

First practice

Final practice

Qualifying

Qualifying results

 Note: Ryan Newman and Quin Houff had their times disallowed and started at the back due to failing inspection

Race

Stage results

Stage One
Laps: 80

Stage Two
Laps: 80

Final stage results

Stage Three
Laps: 107

Race statistics
 Lead changes: 15 among 10 different drivers
 Cautions/Laps: 7 for 35
 Red flags: 0
 Time of race: 2 hours, 51 minutes and 37 seconds
 Average speed:

Media

Television
NBC Sports covered the race on the television side. Rick Allen, Jeff Burton, Steve Letarte and Dale Earnhardt Jr. had the call in the booth for the race. Dave Burns, Parker Kligerman, Marty Snider and Kelli Stavast reported from pit lane during the race.

Radio
PRN had the radio call for the race, which was simulcast on Sirius XM NASCAR Radio. Doug Rice and Mark Garrow called the action from the booth when the field raced down the front straightaway. Doug Turnbull called the action from turns 1 & 2 and Pat Patterson called the action from turns 3 & 4. Brad Gillie, Wendy Venturini, Steve Richards, and Brett McMillan called the duties on pit lane.

Standings after the race

Drivers' Championship standings

Manufacturers' Championship standings

Note: Only the first 16 positions are included for the driver standings.
. – Driver has clinched a position in the Monster Energy NASCAR Cup Series playoffs.

References

2019 Quaker State 400
2019 Monster Energy NASCAR Cup Series
2019 in sports in Kentucky
July 2019 sports events in the United States